John Stuart may refer to:

Politics and military
John Stuart, 3rd Earl of Bute (1713–1792), Prime Minister of Great Britain from 1762 to 1763
John Stuart, 1st Marquess of Bute (1744–1814), British nobleman and politician
John Stuart (loyalist) (1718–1779), British Superintendent of Indian Affairs in southern colonies during American Revolution
John Ferdinand Smyth Stuart (1745–1814), Scottish physician, soldier, and author 
John Stuart (judge) (1793–1876), British Conservative MP 1846–1852, judge from 1852
John Stuart, Count of Maida (1759–1815), British soldier, lieutenant-general during the Napoleonic Wars
John Stuart (British Army officer, born 1811) (1811–1889), British general
Sir John Stuart, 4th Baronet (c. 1752–1821), Scottish MP for Kincardineshire
John Stuart, Lord Mount Stuart (1767–1794), Scottish Tory politician
John Stuart, 12th Earl of Moray (1797–1867), Scottish soldier and politician
John T. Stuart (1807–1885), U.S. Representative from Illinois and law partner of Abraham Lincoln
John Stuart (Canadian politician) (1830–1913), Member of Parliament in the late 19th century
John Stuart (Nova Scotia politician) (1752–1835), lawyer and politician in Nova Scotia

Others
John Stuart (Presbyterian minister) (1743–1821), reviser of the New Testament in Scottish Gaelic
John Stuart (priest) (c1740–1811), Anglican clergyman, missionary, educator and Loyalist
John Stuart (Virginia settler) (1749–1823), western Virginia settler and soldier at the Battle of Point Pleasant
John Stuart of Inchbreck (1751–1827), professor of Greek at Aberdeen University
Sir John James Stuart of Allanbank, Scottish landowner and artist
John Stuart (explorer) (1780–1847), Canadian explorer
John McDouall Stuart (1815–1866), explorer, the first European to successfully traverse Australia from south to north
John Stuart (genealogist) (1813–1877), Scottish antiquarian, genealogist
John Stuart, co-founder of locomotive builders Kerr Stuart
John Stuart (CEO) (1877–1969), CEO of the Quaker Oats Company
John Stuart Jr. (1912–1997), one of the heirs to the Quaker Oats Company fortune
John Stuart (actor) (1898–1979), Scottish actor
John Stuart (abolitionist) (Ottobah Cugoano, c. 1757 – after 1791), African abolitionist
John Leighton Stuart (1876–1962), President of Yenching University and later United States ambassador to China
Johnny Stuart (1901–1970), American baseball player
Johnny Stuart (author) (1940–2003), author and expert on Russian art
John Trevor Stuart (born 1929), British mathematician
John Stuart (weightlifter) (born 1920), Canadian weightlifter
John Stuart (Edinburgh minister), Chaplain in Ordinary to Queen Victoria

See also
John Stewart (disambiguation)
Jon Stewart (disambiguation)
John Stuart Mill (1806–1873), 19th-century philosopher